Young Dumb Thrills is the sixth studio album from English pop rock band McFly. Their first studio album since 2010 (in nearly ten years), the album was released on 13 November 2020, and is their first under record label BMG.

The album debuted at number 2 in the UK selling 20,750 in its first week. It became the band's highest charting album since Wonderland in 2005.

Background
In November 2010, McFly released their fifth studio album, Above the Noise, which became their lowest charting album in the UK. This was followed by a compilation album, Memory Lane: The Best of McFly, in November 2012. In 2013, McFly's sixth studio album was put on hold when they teamed up with Matt Willis and James Bourne from Busted to form the supergroup McBusted. After two years of touring and a self-titled album, Willis and Bourne's former bandmate Charlie Simpson agreed to return to Busted, thus bringing McBusted to an end.

On 3 July 2020, McFly announced The Lost Songs, a collection of demo recordings and their first collection of unreleased material in nearly a decade. That same month, the band revealed that their long-awaited sixth studio album would be called Young Dumb Thrills, and also announced "Happiness" as its lead single. The track "Wild and Young" was initially going to be released as part of Danny Jones' debut solo album, but was used for McFly's comeback album when the band reunited instead.

Singles
"Happiness" was released as the album's lead single on 20 July 2020.

"Growing Up" featuring Mark Hoppus was the second, released on 4 September 2020. Judd stated on Twitter that this was a promotional single, and not an official single. It failed to chart on the UK Singles Top 100 but debuted and peaked at number 80 on the Official Singles Sales Chart Top 100 on 11 September 2020.

"Tonight Is the Night" was the third single, released on 1 October 2020.

"You’re Not Special" is the fourth single, released 21 January 2021.

Track listing

Charts

References

2020 albums
McFly albums